The European Association of Historic Towns and Regions (EAHTR), founded by the Congress of the Council of Europe in October 1999, is a self-governing organisation which groups together twelve associations, such as the Historic Towns Forum of Great Britain, from eleven states, namely the Czech Republic, Finland, Ireland, Malta, The Netherlands, Romania, Russia, Slovakia, Slovenia, Turkey and the United Kingdom, which claims to represent over 1,000 of Europe's historic towns.

It has the status of a company under English law. According to its constitution (available on the website): "The European Association of Historic Towns and Regions was incorporated on 8th April 2002 under the law of England and Wales as a company limited by guarantee and not having a share capital. The company registration number is 4411400."

It defines its principal objective as 'the identification and sharing of experience and good practice in the sustainable urban conservation and management of historic areas through international collaboration and co-operation between towns and cities and other involved organisations'.

EAHTR is based in Norwich, England. The President, since 1999, is Louis Roppe (Belgium) and the Secretary-General, since 1999, is Brian Smith (UK). According to its website, the last annual report was issued in 2006 and the last newsletter in 2003. It has participated in several Council of Europe conferences. The website exists in English only.

References

External links
 Official website

Cultural heritage of Europe
Historic preservation
Architecture organizations
Organizations established in 1999
International organizations based in Europe
1999 in Europe
Architectural conservation
1999 establishments in England
Organisations based in Norwich
Private companies limited by guarantee of England